Steven Bernstein, ASC, DGA, WGA is an American cinematographer, director, screenwriter and author. In 1992 he won the Best Artistic Contribution Award at the Tokyo International Film Festival for Like Water for Chocolate alongside Emmanuel Lubezki. He also won the Cannes Golden Lion for his work in commercials. His book Film Production (Focal Press) has been translated into several languages and at one time was the bestselling textbook about film making. Bernstein was a 2014 ASC nominee for the Outstanding Achievement in Cinematography in One-Hour Episodic Television Series Award for his work on Magic City. Bernstein is a regular contributor to SonyCine Magazine where he writes articles on various aspects of filmmaking. Bernstein is a regular subject matter expert for articles about screenwriting and filmmaking for Adobe creative hub.

Bernstein has directed shorts, music videos and television commercials, and has lectured widely. He made his directing feature film debut with 2014's Decoding Annie Parker (Helen Hunt, Samantha Morton, Aaron Paul), for which he was awarded The Alfred P. Sloan Award at the Hampton's International Film Festival. Bernstein's second feature, Last Call was released theatrically in the US on 25 November 2020. It is a surrealistic biopic about the final day of Alcoholic poet Dylan Thomas's life, starring John Malkovich, Rhys Ifans, Rodrigo Santoro, Romola Garai, Zosia Mamet, and Tony Hale, and which Bernstein wrote, produced, and directed. Bernstein's recent script commissions include; A Perfect Place, Angela and Althea and Last Resort

Since 2016 Bernstein has worked with members of the Greek government to expand the Greek film industry and attract international film and television production to Greece. Bernstein spearheaded an initiative to introduce a tax rebate as an incentive to film producers to shoot in Greece. The tax incentive bill was passed in August 2017 and became effective in February 2018. As part of his initiative, Bernstein is training 400 to 500 Greek film students a year and is building a state of the art film studio in Greece.

Bernstein has been featured as the subject of articles in many publications including American Cinematographer Magazine, MovieMaker Magazine, People Magazine, Playboy Magazine and Mancode Magazine.

Personal life
Bernstein was born in Buffalo, NY in 1958 to parents Charles Bernstein, M.D. and Sylvia Bernstein. He has a son Adam from his first marriage to Elizabeth Bernstein and currently resides with his partner the designer and film producer Carolyn Rodney.

Filmography

Awards

References

External links

Living people
American directors
American cinematographers
Year of birth missing (living people)